Thomas-Steven Da Veiga (born 25 July 1995) is a French professional footballer who plays as a left-back for Vitré.

Born in Neuilly-sur-Marne, near Paris, Da Veiga played junior football for several local clubs before being signed by AS Monaco in 2010 at the age of 15. While at Monaco, he was part of the side that won the French under-19 championship in 2013. He was signed by Niort in the summer of 2015, one of two left-backs brought in to replace the outgoing Quentin Bernard.

Da Veiga made his professional debut for Niort on 11 August 2015, playing 77 minutes of the 2–3 defeat to Sochaux in the first round of the Coupe de la Ligue. He then played his first Ligue 2 game three days later, a 1–1 draw against the same opponents at the Stade René Gaillard. It was announced that he had left the club at the end of the 2015–16 season, but he was unable to find a new club and consequently remained with Niort until the end of his contract in 2017.

Career statistics

References

External links
 
 
 

1995 births
Living people
People from Neuilly-sur-Marne
French footballers
Footballers from Seine-Saint-Denis
Association football defenders
Ligue 2 players
AS Monaco FC players
Chamois Niortais F.C. players
CD San Roque de Lepe footballers
AS Vitré players
French expatriate footballers
French expatriate sportspeople in Spain
Expatriate footballers in Spain